VVOG is a football club from Harderwijk, Netherlands. They currently participate in the Derde Divisie (Saturday league). 

The club's name, Voetbalvereniging Ons Genoegen, translates as Football Club Our Pleasure. VVOG became the champion in Dutch Saturday and national amateur football in 1968. The club won the Districtsbeker for the East district in 2003.

External links
 Official site

Football clubs in the Netherlands
1927 establishments in the Netherlands
Association football clubs established in 1927
Football clubs in Gelderland
Harderwijk